Kalophrynus bunguranus is a species of frog in the family Microhylidae.
It is endemic to Indonesia.
Its natural habitats are subtropical or tropical moist lowland forests and intermittent freshwater marshes.

References

Kalophrynus
Amphibians of Indonesia
Taxonomy articles created by Polbot
Amphibians described in 1895
Taxa named by Albert Günther